Phyllocnistis exaeta is a moth of the family Gracillariidae, known from Assam, India. It was named by E. Meyrick in 1926.

References

Phyllocnistis
Endemic fauna of India
Moths of Asia